is a badminton player from Japan.

Career 
She competed at the 2005 World Badminton Championships in Anaheim. In the women's singles event she reached the third round before losing to Wang Chen of Hong Kong. At the same year, she won the women's singles bronze medal at the Asian Championships after lose to her compatriot Kaori Mori in the semi final.

In the 2010 BWF World Championship, she caused an upset over the world number one ranking player, Wang Yihan in the third round but lost to Wang Lin in the quarterfinals.

In the 2011 All England Open, she came second in the women's singles, losing in the final to China's Wang Shixian.

Hirose spent 23 years career in badminton and announced her retirement at the end of National Championships in December 2014. She then started a career as a coach in Japan National B Team.

Achievements

Asian Games 
Women's singles

Asian Championships 
Women's singles

Asian Junior Championships 
Girls' singles

BWF Superseries 
The BWF Superseries, launched on 14 December 2006 and implemented in 2007, was a series of elite badminton tournaments, sanctioned by Badminton World Federation (BWF). BWF Superseries had two level such as Superseries and Superseries Premier. A season of Superseries featured twelve tournaments around the world, which introduced since 2011, with successful players invited to the Superseries Finals held at the year end.

Women's singles

  BWF Superseries Finals tournament
  BWF Superseries Premier tournament
  BWF Superseries tournament

IBF World Grand Prix 
The World Badminton Grand Prix sanctioned by International Badminton Federation (IBF) since 1983.

Women's singles

BWF International Challenge/Series 
Women's singles

  BWF International Challenge tournament
  BWF International Series tournament

Record against selected opponents 
Record against year-end Finals finalists, World Championships semi-finalists, and Olympic quarter-finalists.

References

External links 

 

1985 births
Living people
Sportspeople from Hyōgo Prefecture
Japanese female badminton players
Badminton players at the 2008 Summer Olympics
Olympic badminton players of Japan
Badminton players at the 2006 Asian Games
Badminton players at the 2010 Asian Games
Asian Games silver medalists for Japan
Asian Games bronze medalists for Japan
Asian Games medalists in badminton
Medalists at the 2006 Asian Games
Medalists at the 2010 Asian Games
20th-century Japanese women
21st-century Japanese women